Paul Duddridge (born 30 November 1966) is a writer, comedy agent, producer and director.

Biography
Born in Cardiff, Wales Duddridge attended Radyr Comprehensive School.

Duddridge started his career at the BBC as writer on the children's game show Run the Risk.

As an agent Duddridge represented Phill Jupitus, Rob Brydon, Alistair Mcgowan, Paul McKenna and Michael McIntyre.

Duddridge founded the London-based production company "Jones The Film" in 2003. He directed, produced and wrote critically acclaimed television shows "Annually Retentive" for the BBC and "Director's Commentary" for ITV1. Other credit includes "The Keith Barret Show."

He is the author of Ever Dated a Psycho? (2006)
 
Retiring from representation in 2007 he moved to the US to write and produce TV and film.

Duddridge wrote and fronted award-winning documentary "A Film About Races." He made his feature directing debut in 2016 with Mothers and Daughters.

In 2018, Duddridge's second feature film Together starring Peter Bowles and Sylvia Syms was released. It premiered in the UK and is an official Selection for the 2018 British Film Festival in Australia.

Currently he is Head of Entertainment at digital network TV4 in Los Angeles.

Notes

References
 
 
 
 
 

Living people
British television producers
1966 births
People educated at Radyr Comprehensive School
Writers from Cardiff